Dominique Collinet is a Belgian businessman. He was the chief executive officer of Carmeuse, a leading global producer of lime. He is also vice-president of the European Landowners Organisation, and a member of the business club Cercle de Lorraine. He retired in 2003, and his son, Rodolphe Collinet, is the present CEO of Carmeuse.

Sources
 Carmeuse Group
 Cercle de Lorraine (member)
 history of Union Wallonne des Entreprises (President 1993–1996)

Year of birth missing (living people)
Living people
Belgian businesspeople
Walloon people